Troy Cassar-Daley (born 18 May 1969) is an Australian country music songwriter and entertainer.

Cassar-Daley has released thirteen studio albums, two live albums and five compilation albums over 30 years, including the platinum-selling The Great Country Songbook with Adam Harvey. Throughout this time he has received awards including five ARIA Music Awards, forty Golden Guitars, nine Deadly Awards (Australian Indigenous Artist Awards), four Country Music Association of Australia Entertainer of the Year awards and two National Indigenous Music Awards.

Early life and career
Cassar-Daley was born on 18 May 1969 in the Sydney suburb of Surry Hills to a Maltese-Australian father and an Aboriginal mother from the Gumbaynggirr and Bundjalung people. At a very young age, he moved with his mother to Grafton in north-eastern New South Wales. At eleven, Troy went to the Tamworth Country Music Festival and returned the next year to busk on the streets. At 16, he and his band, Little Eagle, were touring the North Coast of New South Wales and he made the top 10 in Tamworth's Toyota Star Maker Quest. He won the 1986 "Search for a Star" competition and then toured with Brian Young for seven months in which he began to develop his songwriting skills. After returning home he replaced James Blundell as leader of country music band The Blue Heeler Band.

Solo career
By late 1993 Cassar-Daley had enough original songs for a debut EP. The first single "Dream Out Loud" was released on 24 October 1994 by Sony Music and reached number-one on the Australian country music charts. His first album, Beyond the Dancing, was released in January 1995 and won the ARIA Award for Best Country Album at the ARIA Music Awards of 1995. At the 1996 Country Music Awards, in Tamworth, Cassar-Daley won Best Male Vocalist. He also made a cameo appearance in the motion picture Race the Sun in which he performed a song in a bar scene.

In June 1996, Cassar-Daley was part of the Australian Country Music Showcase in Nashville. The Showcase included Lee Kernaghan, Gina Jeffreys and Tommy Emmanuel. As a result, Cassar-Daley returned to the US to record his new album True Believer (1998) with Steve Dorff. His follow-up, Big River (1999),won another best country album ARIA Award at the ARIA Music Awards of 2000. His next four studio albums were Long Way Home (2002), Borrowed & Blue (2004), Brighter Day (2005), and I Love This Place (2009), the latter two also winning best country album ARIA Awards.

Cassar-Daley performed the national anthem at the 2003 NRL grand final. He partnered up with Kate Ritchie for the singing competition It Takes Two aired on Seven Network in 2006. In May 2007 he re-appeared on the same show, this time partnered with Krystal Forscutt, a former contestant on Network Ten's Big Brother program. The same year, Cassar-Daley was featured in Wiggles music videos for the songs "Old Dan Tucker" and "Turkey in the Straw". Cassar-Daley with Kasey Chambers and Shane Nicholson played together at the Melbourne Cricket Ground on 14 March 2009 for Sound Relief which was a multi-venue rock music concert in support of relief for the Victorian Bushfire Crisis. The event was held simultaneously with another concert taking place at the Sydney Cricket Ground. All the proceeds from the Melbourne Concert went to the Red Cross Victorian Bushfire Relief Appeal.

Cassar-Daley went on to release the albums Home (2012), The Great Country Songbook with Adam Harvey (2013), and Freedom Ride (2015). In August 2016, Cassar-Daley released his first book, an autobiography of his early life and music career titled Things I Carry Around with an accompanying album of the same title. In 2017 Cassar-Daley was the 50th inductee into the prestigious Australian Roll of Renown. In October 2018, Cassar-Daley released his 42-track double album Greatest Hits, along with a new single called "Wouldn't Change A Thing" on the Bloodlines label, part of Mushroom Group. The extensive album was also released on vinyl.

In June 2020, Cassar-Daley signed a worldwide label deal with Sony Music Entertainment Australia; he had first signed to the label in 1995. He released the albums Christmas for Cowboys in 2020 and The World Today in 2021, which one the best country album award at that year's ARIA Music Awards.

Personal life

Cassar-Daley is married to radio and television presenter Laurel Edwards with whom he has two children. One of their children is singer-songwriter Jem Cassar-Daley.

In 2020, Cassar-Daley's participation in Australia's Who Do You Think You Are? was broadcast on SBS, where he traced both his ancestral roots on his father's side in Malta, and his mother's Aboriginal Australian ancestry.

Discography

Studio albums

Live albums

Compilation albums

Extended Plays

Awards and nominations

AIR Awards
The Australian Independent Record Awards (commonly known informally as AIR Awards) is an annual awards night to recognise, promote and celebrate the success of Australia's Independent Music sector. They commenced in 2006.

|-
| AIR Awards of 2011
|Troy Cassar-Daley Live 
| Best Independent Artist
| 
|-
| AIR Awards of 2015
|Freedom Ride 
| Best Independent Country Album
| 
|-

APRA Awards
Cassar-Daley had been nominated for twelve awards, winning three at the APRA Awards.

|-
| 1998 || "Little Things" || Most Performed Country Work || 
|-
| 1999 || "Biggest Disappointment" || Most Performed Country Work || 
|-
| 2000 || "They Don't Make 'Em Like That Anymore" || Most Performed Country Work || 
|-
| 2004 || "Wish I Was a Train" (with Paul Kelly) || Most Performed Country Work || 
|-
| 2005 || "Factory Man" || Most Performed Country Work || 
|-
| 2007 || "Going Back Home" || Most Performed Country Work || 
|-
| 2008 || "Everything's Going to be Alright" || Country Work of the Year || 
|-
| 2010 || "Big Big Love" || Song of the Year || 
|-
| 2010 || "Big Big Love" || Country Work of the Year || 
|-
| 2012 || "Country Is" (Troy Cassar-Daley / Colin Buchanan) || Song of the Year || 
|-
| rowspan="2"| 2013 || "Country Is" || Most Performed Country Work || 
|-
| "Home" || Song of the Year || 
|-
| rowspan="2"| 2016 
| "Another Australian Day"
| rowspan="2"| Song of the Year
| 
|-
| "Freedom Ride" (with Paul Kelly)
| 
|-
| rowspan="2"| 2020
| "Wouldn't Change a Thing"
| Most Performed Country Work of the Year
| 
|-
| "Shutting Down Our Town" (Cassar-Daley) by Jimmy Barnes featuring Troy Cassar-Daley
| Most Performed Rock Work of the Year
| 
|}

ARIA Awards
Cassar-Daley has been nominated for thirteen awards, winning five at the ARIA Music Awards

|-
| 1995 || Beyond the Dancing || Best Country Album ||  
|-
| 1997 || "True Believers" || Best Country Album ||  
|-
| 1998 || True Believer || Best Country Album ||  
|-
| 2000 || Big River || Best Country Album ||  
|-
| 2002 || Long Way Home || Best Country Album ||  
|-
| 2004 || Borrowed & Blue || Best Country Album ||  
|-
| 2006 || Brighter Day || Best Country Album ||  
|-
| 2009 || I Love This Place || Best Country Album ||  
|-
| 2011 || Troy Cassar-Daley Live || Best Country Album ||  
|-
| 2012 || Home || Best Country Album ||  
|-
| 2013 || The Great Country Songbook (with Adam Harvey) || Best Country Album ||  
|-
| 2015 || Freedom Ride || Best Country Album ||  
|-
| 2021
| The World Today ||  Best Country Album || 
|-

CMAA Awards
The Country Music Awards of Australia is an annual awards night held in January during the Tamworth Country Music Festival, celebrating recording excellence in the Australian country music industry. Cassar-Daley has won forty awards, the most of any artist. Cassar-Daley was inducted into the Australian Roll of Renown in 2019. 

 (wins only)
|-
|rowspan="1"|  1996 || "End of the Road" || Male Vocalist of the Year || 
|-
|rowspan="3"|  1998 || True Believer || Album of the Year || 
|-
| "Little Things" || Male Vocalist of the Year || 
|-
| "Little Things" || Video of the Year || 
|-
|rowspan="2"|  2000 || "They Don't Make 'Em Like That Anymore" || Male Vocalist of the Year || 
|-
| "They Don't Make 'Em Like That Anymore" || ARPA Song of the Year || 
|-
|rowspan="3"|  2003 || "Born to Survive" || Male Vocalist of the Year || 
|-
| "Wish I Was a Train"  (with Paul Kelly)|| Vocal Collaboration of the Year || 
|-
| "Born to Survive" || ARPA Song of the Year || 
|-
|rowspan="4"|  2006 || "Lonesome But Free" || Male Vocalist of the Year || 
|-
| "Bird On A Wire" (with Jimmy Barnes) || Vocal Collaboration of the Year || 
|-
| "Yellow Belly" || Instrumental of the Year || 
|-
| "Lonesome But Free" || ARPA Song of the Year || 
|-
|rowspan="1"|  2008 || "Everything’s Going To Be Alright" || Male Vocalist of the Year || 
|-
|rowspan="6"|  2010 || I Love This Place || Male Vocalist of the Year || 
|-
|I Love This Place || Album of the Year || 
|-
| "Ain’t Gonna Change for You" (with The McClymonts) || Vocal Collaboration of the Year || 
|-
| "Chasin' Rodeo" || Heritage Song of the Year || 
|-
| "Big Big Love" || APRA Song of the Year || 
|-
| "Big Big Love" || Single of the Year || 
|-
|rowspan="1"|  2011 || "Sacred Bones" || Toyota Heritage Song of the Year || 
|-
|rowspan="5"|  2013 || Home || Male Vocalist of the Year || 
|-
|Home || Album of the Year (Artist) || 
|-
|Home || Album of the Year (Producer) || 
|-
| "Country Is" || Single of the Year || 
|-
| "Home" || APRA Song of the Year || 
|-
|rowspan="1"|  2015 || "My Country My Land" (with Dean Perrett) || Vocal Collaboration of the Year || 
|-
|rowspan="7"|  2016 || Freedom Ride || Album of the Year (Artist) || 
|-
| Freedom Ride || Album of the Year (Producer) || 
|-
| "Freedom Ride" || Male Vocalist of the Year || 
|-
| "Freedom Ride" || Toyota Heritage Song of the Year || 
|-
| "Freedom Ride" || APRA Song of the Year || 
|-
| "Take a Walk in My Country" || Single of the Year || 
|-
| Troy Cassar-Daley" || CMAA Producer of the Year  || 
|-
|rowspan="2"|  2017 || Things I Carry Round || Album of the Year (Artist) || 
|-
| Things I Carry Round || Album of the Year (Producer) || 
|-
|rowspan="2"|  2019 || "Shadows on the Hill" || Heritage Song of the Year || 
|-
| himself  || Australian Roll of Renown || 
|-
|rowspan="3"| 2022 || The World Today|| Top Selling Album of the Year || 
|-
| himself || Male Artist of the Year || 
|-
| "South" (with Ian Moss) || Vocal Collaboration of the Year || 
|-
|}

Deadly Awards
The Deadly Awards, (commonly known simply as The Deadlys), was an annual celebration of Australian Aboriginal and Torres Strait Islander achievement in music, sport, entertainment and community. They ran from 1996 to 2013.

|-
| Deadly Awards 1997
| True Believer
| Album of the Year
| 
|-
| Deadly Awards 2001
| himself
| Country Artist of the Year
| 
|-
| Deadly Awards 2003
| himself
| Male Artist of the Year
| 
|-
| Deadly Awards 2003
| himself
| Male Artist of the Year
| 
|-
| Deadly Awards 2004
| himself
| Male Artist of the Year
| 
|-
| rowspan="2"| Deadly Awards 2006
| himself
| Male Artist of the Year
| 
|-
| "Lonesome But Free"
| Single of the Year
| 
|-
| Deadly Awards 2007
| "Going Back Home"
| Song of the Year
| 
|-
| Deadly Awards 2012
| Home
| Album of the Year
| 
|-
| Deadly Awards 2013
| himself
| Male Artist of the Year
| 
|-

Mo Awards
The Australian Entertainment Mo Awards (commonly known informally as the Mo Awards), were annual Australian entertainment industry awards. They recognise achievements in live entertainment in Australia from 1975 to 2016. Troy Cassar-Daley won six awards in that time.
 (wins only)
|-
| 1997
| Troy Cassar-Daley
| Male Country Entertainer of the Year
| 
|-
| 1998
| Troy Cassar-Daley
| Male Country Entertainer of the Year
| 
|-
| 1999
| Troy Cassar-Daley
| Male Country Entertainer of the Year
| 
|-
| 2002
| Troy Cassar-Daley
| Male Country Entertainer of the Year
| 
|-
| 2003
| Troy Cassar-Daley
| Male Country Entertainer of the Year
| 
|-
| 2008
| Troy Cassar-Daley
| Slim Dusty Male Country Vocal Performer of the Year
| 
|-

National Indigenous Music Awards
The National Indigenous Music Awards recognise excellence, innovation and leadership among Aboriginal and Torres Strait Islander musicians from throughout Australia. They commenced in 2004.

|-
| rowspan="2"| 2012
| himself
| Artist of the Year
| 
|-
| Home
| Album of the Year
| 
|-
| rowspan="3"| 2017
| himself
| Artist of the Year
| 
|-
| Things I Carry Around
| Album of the Year
| 
|-
| "Things I Carry Around"
| Song of the Year
| 
|-
| rowspan="2"| 2021
| "Back On Country"
| Film Clip of the Year
| 
|-

Queensland Music Awards
The Queensland Music Awards (previously known as Q Song Awards) are annual awards celebrating Queensland, Australia's brightest emerging artists and established legends. They commenced in 2006.

 (wins only)
|-
| 2009
| "Big Big Love"
| Published Song of the Year 
| 
|}

References

External links 

 Official website

1969 births
APRA Award winners
ARIA Award winners
Australian country guitarists
Australian country singers
Australian male singers
Australian people of Maltese descent
Indigenous Australian musicians
Living people
Australian male guitarists
People from New South Wales
People from Grafton, New South Wales